Rod O'Connor may refer to:

 Rod O'Connor (footballer) (born 1948), Australian rules footballer
 Rod O'Connor (announcer) (1914–1964), American radio and television announcer

See also
Roderic O'Connor (disambiguation)